FC Rosengård is a Swedish professional football club located in the area Rosengård of Malmö. The club was founded on 4 September 1917 as Malmö Boll & Idrottsförening but has since been merged once and renamed twice. The club has been the starting ground for some Swedish football players including Zlatan Ibrahimović, Yksel Osmanovski and Labinot Harbuzi.

History
The club was founded on 4 September 1917 as Malmö Boll & Idrottsförening, or MBI in short. In the early years, the club also played bandy, winning the Scania district championship in this sport in 1930.

One of the biggest moments in the history of the club was when they participated in the playoff to Allsvenskan, the top tier of Swedish football in 1938 against Degerfors IF but lost.

In 1973, the club moved to its present location in the suburb of Rosengård.

In 2001, the club merged with Turk Anadolu FF to create Malmö Anadolu BI, MABI in short.

In 2008, the club was renamed to FC Rosengård.

The club is affiliated to the Skånes Fotbollförbund.

Season to season

Attendances

In the following seasons FC Rosengård have had the following average attendances:

Current squad

As of 3 April 2017

Technical staff
as of 3 April 2017

Club records
 Most appearances: 520 — Mats Olsson

Footnotes

External links
Official site

 
Turkish association football clubs outside Turkey
Football clubs in Malmö
Association football clubs established in 1917
1917 establishments in Sweden